Fintry Provincial Park and Protected Area, also known as Fintry Estate, is a provincial park located in the town of Fintry, British Columbia, Canada.  It is situated approximately 34 kilometres north of Kelowna and 49 kilometres south of Vernon on the westside of the Okanagan Lake.  

The estate's original manor house and octagonal dairy barn have been restored and are open for tours in the summer.

Campsites are located in close proximity to the lake and includes a nearby dock.  A hike on the opposite side of the park also features a short but steep stair-climb to Fintry Falls of Shorts Creek, the park's main feature.

References

External links
Fintry Estate - Friends of Fintry Provincial Park Society

Provincial parks of British Columbia
Regional District of Central Okanagan
Provincial parks in the Okanagan
Museums in British Columbia
Historic house museums in British Columbia
2001 establishments in British Columbia
Protected areas established in 2001